Sriranga Wasudev 'Ranga' Sohoni  (5 March 1918 – 19 May 1993) was an Indian international cricketer. He was an all-rounder, batting well under pressure and bowling relentlessly on South Asian surfaces.

International Cricket
Sohoni toured England in 1946 and Australia in 1947/48 with the Indian team. He opened the bowling against England is the two Tests that he played in the former tour. At Old Trafford the last wicket partnership of Dattaram Hindlekar and Sohoni hung around for 13 minutes to avoid a defeat.

Domestic Cricket

From 108 First-Class matches that spanned close to three decades, Sohoni scored 4,307 runs at 28.17 with 8 hundreds. He also picked up 232 wickets at 32.96 with 11 five-wicket hauls and 2 ten-wicket hauls. In Ranji Trophy, his numbers were exceptional (42 matches, 2,162 runs at 34.87, 139 wickets at 24.49). Unfortunately, most of his twenties were taken away by World War II, which saw very little cricket.

Sohoni played for Bombay, Maharashtra, and Baroda in the Ranji Trophy. He won titles with the first two teams and lost the 1948–49 final with Baroda. He captained Bombay and Maharashtra in eleven Ranji matches and captained Bombay in their win in 1953–54. Sohoni played for the Bombay University side between 1938–39 and 1940–41 and captained them in the second of those years. He also appeared in one unofficial Test.

In Ranji Trophy, his finest season was 1940–41 when he helped Maharashtra retain their title. Against Western India in the zonal final, he scored a career best 218* and put on 342* for the fourth wicket with Vijay Hazare, then an Indian record for any wicket. In the last innings of the final against Madras, he hit 104 on a crumbling wicket. He scored 655 runs in the Ranji season, a new record, at an average of 131 and 808 in all first class matches with five hundreds.

Personal and professional life 
Sohoni "was tall, fair skinned and light eyed" with "film star looks". He was offered a role in movies by V. Shantaram .

He was a pro in Lancashire League with Lower House Club. He did B.A(Hons) and served in various government departments before retiring as a class I officer in the government of Maharashtra.

His death was due to a heart attack.

References

 Obituary in Indian Cricket 1993
  Mihir Bose, A History of Indian Cricket
  Richard Cashman, Patrons, Players and the Crowd

External links

Indian cricketers
India Test cricketers
Mumbai cricketers
Baroda cricketers
Maharashtra cricketers
Hindus cricketers
South Zone cricketers
West Zone cricketers
1918 births
1993 deaths
Cricketers from Rajasthan